Amy Maghera (formerly Amrit Maghera) is a British model and actress, working in Hindi, English and Punjabi films. From 2015 to 2017, she appeared in the British soap opera Hollyoaks as Neeta Kaur.

Career
Maghera began her career as a dancer for the likes of Kanye West and Guns N' Roses. She was working as a background dancer on the sets of a Bollywood film in Mumbai when she was scouted by a modelling agency bringing in a five-year contract with Lakme, India's highest top end cosmetic company as its brand ambassador. She also featured as a backing dancer for the £1 Fish song by One Pound Fish Man in December 2012. This launched her career in modelling as she went on to do assignments with reputed brands like Satya Paul, Miss Sixty, L’Oreal, Skechers, Nokia and Olay among others, besides participating in fashion shows with designers like Alison Kanugo and Neeta Lulla. In 2014, she appeared in Mad About Dance. She also did the lead vocals for the film. A Punjabi film Goreyan Nu Daffa Karo with singer Amrinder Gill followed soon after.

In April 2015, a British-Asian film featuring her, Amar Akbar & Tony, was released in the United Kingdom. She then acted alongside Sandhya Mridul, Tannishtha Chatterjee, Sarah-Jane Dias and Anushka Manchanda in the 2015 film Angry Indian Goddesses, a film which marked the debut of Pan Nalin in mainstream Hindi cinema. In October 2015, Maghera joined the cast of the Channel 4 soap opera, Hollyoaks as Neeta Kaur. She departed the serial in November 2017 after her character was killed off. Her death scene was nominated for Best Show-Stopper at the 2018 Inside Soap Awards.

Personal life
On 31 March 2021, she uploaded a post on Instagram stating that she had legally changed her forename from Amrit to Amy. She stated that Amy has been a lifelong nickname for her, and that she is equally "proud of my mixed heritage - Indian and White". Her name change was not to turn her back on any culture, as she also stated in the post that she is maintaining her mother's Indian surname Maghera.

Filmography

Notes

References

External links
 

Living people
English film actresses
English female models
English soap opera actresses
British film actresses
British people of Punjabi descent
British people of Indian descent
British actresses of Indian descent
English expatriates in India
Actresses in Hindi cinema
Actresses in Punjabi cinema
British expatriate actresses in India
European actresses in India
Actresses of European descent in Indian films
21st-century English actresses
Place of birth missing (living people)
Year of birth missing (living people)